Jukka-Pekka Tanner (born 24 April 1963 in Tampere) is a Finnish former wrestler who competed in the 1984 Summer Olympics.

References

External links
 

1963 births
Living people
Olympic wrestlers of Finland
Wrestlers at the 1984 Summer Olympics
Finnish male sport wrestlers
Sportspeople from Tampere